Kleinruppin forever is a German romantic comedy film, released in late 2004.

The film is set in 1985 and stars Tobias Schenke as Tim Winter, a West German teenager from Bremen with aspirations of being a professional tennis player. On a school trip to East Germany, Tim meets his identical twin brother Ronny (also played by Tobias Schenke). Ronny switches places with Tim, forcing Tim to experience life and love in East Germany.

The film can be seen as part of the Ostalgie movement, similar to the films Good Bye, Lenin! (2003) and Sonnenallee (1999), which look back nostalgically at life in East Germany.

See also
 Le Fils de l'Autre (2012 film)

External links
Official site

2004 films
2004 romantic comedy films
German romantic comedy films
2000s German-language films
Films set in 1985
Films about twin brothers
Ostalgie
2000s German films
Films set in East Germany
Films set in West Germany